Sara Warburg (1805–1884), was a German banker.  

She was the manager of the M.M.Warburg & CO, the 4th–biggest bank in Hamburg, after the death of her spouse in 1856 until 1865.

References 

 
1805 births
1884 deaths
19th-century German businesspeople
German bankers
Women bankers
Warburg family